William Hickman Moore (May 26, 1861 – March 13, 1946) was an American politician who served as Mayor of Seattle from 1906 to 1908.

Career 
In 1906, Moore became the mayor if Seattle. Moore also served as a member of the Washington State Senate from the 34th district from 1902 to 1906 and as a member of the Seattle City Council from 1916 to 1922 and from 1924 to 1930. In between his stint as mayor and city councilman, Moore worked in private practice and was appointed to the city charter commission in 1914.

Personal life 
Moore died on March 13, 1946, at his home in Seattle.

References

1861 births
1946 deaths
Democratic Party Washington (state) state senators
Mayors of Seattle
Seattle City Council members
University of Michigan alumni